The Balkan green lizard (Lacerta trilineata) is a species of lizard in the family Lacertidae. It is the most widespread of the Balkans lizard species. It is found in Albania, Bosnia and Herzegovina, Bulgaria, Croatia, Greece,  Montenegro, North Macedonia, Romania, Serbia, Israel, Syria, and Turkey. Its natural habitats are Mediterranean-type shrubby vegetation, sandy shores, arable land, pastureland, plantations, and rural gardens. It is threatened by habitat loss.

Reproduction
Males and females from Greece have a reproductive cycle that begins in April and ends in July. Both sexes achieve sexual maturity when they reach approximately 80 millimeters in body size.

References

Sagonas K, Pafilis P, Lymberakis P, Valakos ED. Sexual maturation and reproduction of the balkan green lizard lacerta trilineata specimens in mainland and island populations from Greece. North-Western Journal of Zoology. 2019;15(1):55-61.

Lacerta (genus)
Reptiles described in 1886
Taxa named by Jacques von Bedriaga
Taxonomy articles created by Polbot